The Battle of Tianmen (天门战斗) was a battle between the nationalists and the communists immediately after World War II during the Chinese Civil War in Tianmen, Hubei, China and resulted in communist victory.

Prelude
Like similar clashes immediately after the end of World War II between the Communists and the Nationalists in China, this conflict was also rooted in the fact that Chiang Kai-shek had realized his nationalist regime simply had neither sufficient troops nor enough transportation assets to deploy his forces into the Japanese-occupied regions of China.  Unwilling to let the Communists, who had already dominated most of the rural regions in China, to further expand their territories by accepting the Japanese surrender and thus would consequently control the Japanese-occupied regions, Chiang Kai-shek ordered the Japanese and their Chinese puppet regime not to surrender to the Communists and keep their fighting capabilities to “maintain order” in the Japanese-occupied regions, fighting off the Communists as necessary until the final arrivals and completion of the deployment of the Nationalist troops.  As a result, most members of the Japanese puppet regimes and their military forces rejoined the Nationalists.

However, most of these former Nationalists-turned-Japanese-puppet-regime forces were not from Chiang Kai-shek’s own clique, but instead mainly consisted of troops of warlords who were only nominally under Chiang Kai-shek before World War II, since they were Nationalists in name only and mostly maintained their independent and semi-independent status.  These warlords were only interested in keeping their own power and defected to the Japanese when Japanese invaders offered to let them keep their power in exchange for their collaboration. After World War II these forces once again returned to the Nationalist camp for the same reason they defected to the Japanese invaders.  Obviously it was difficult for Chiang to immediately get rid of these warlords as soon as they surrendered to Chiang and rejoined the Nationalists, because such a move would alienate other factions within the Nationalist ranks, and these former warlords could still help the Nationalists gain more territories by holding on to what was under their control until Chiang completed the deployment of his own troops to take over.  Chiang Kai-shek’s objective was to simultaneously solve two problems: the warlord problem that had plagued China for so long and the problem of the extermination of Communism together. This, as subsequent history has shown, was his fatal mistake.

Nationalist Strategy
In accordance with his strategy to simultaneously solve these two problems, Chiang Kai-shek and his followers had hoped that these former Japanese puppet regime's warlords who rejoined the Nationalists would be able to hold on to their territories long enough for Chiang to deploy his own troops.  If the Communists were victorious in such conflicts, however, the result could still benefit Chiang and China because the power of these warlords would be reduced as their military forces were smashed by the Communists, and the warlord problem that had plagued China for so long could thus be greatly reduced, while at the same time the Communists would be weakened by their battles with the warlords and Chiang's own troops would have an easier time in taking control.

For the former Nationalists-turned-Japanese-puppet-regime forces it was no problem to again follow Chiang's orders, and they were eager to prove their "loyalty" to him. They were well aware that their collaboration with the Japanese invaders resulted in their being hated and despised by the Chinese population, including their former Nationalist colleagues who had refused to surrender to or collaborate with the Japanese and in fact continued fighting against the invaders to whom these warlords had defected. Therefore, in the impending demilitarization after World War II, they were certainly to be—at best—disarmed and discharged, resulting in their power being reduced or even eliminated. Therefore, if they saw a chance to retain the power they saw slipping away from them they would seize the chance to grab at it, and if they could legitimize and ingratiate themselves to their former commander by helping him to fight the Communists, they were more than happy to do so.

Communist Strategy
The Communist strategy was much simpler than that of the Nationalists because there was no huge division within the Communist ranks, as there were among the Nationalists.  The Communists had already earned considerable popular support by being the only Chinese force left in the region fighting the Japanese invaders and their puppet regime after the Nationalists withdrew, and after successfully establishing Communist bases in the rural regions, where the general populace had a much better life under them than they did in the Japanese-occupied areas. The people generally agreed that the Communists, rather than the Nationalists,  deserved to represent China in accepting the invaders’ surrender.

The battle
After the former nationalist turned Japanese puppet regime forces who rejoined the nationalists after World War II had refused to surrender to the communists, the only Chinese force in the region under the order of Chiang Kai-shek’s regime, the 15th Brigade of the 5th Division of the communist New Fourth Army launched its offensive in Tianmen, Hubei, China against these units.  Unable to fight off the communists, these former nationalist turned Japanese puppet regime forces who rejoined the nationalists after World War II enlisted the help of their former Japanese master, which only further enraged the local population, whose support went to the communist side as a result.

The battle lasted only several hours, and after 50 Japanese troops and over 100 troops of the former nationalist turned Japanese puppet regime forces who rejoined the nationalists after World War II were killed, the remaining 5 Japanese troops and 200+ troops of the former nationalist turned Japanese puppet regime forces who rejoined the nationalists after World War II were forced to surrender.  The communists had captured a cannon, a heavy machine gun, five light machine guns, and over 270 repeating rifles.  The communist casualties was light in terms of numbers, but Huang Xiting (黄西廷), a battalion commander and Yang Li (杨力), a battalion level political commissar were among those killed.

Outcome
Like other similar clashes immediately after the end of World War II between the communists and the nationalists in China, this conflict also showed that Chiang Kai-shek’s attempt to simultaneously solve the warlord problem that had plagued China for so long and the problem of the extermination of communism together proved to be a fatal mistake.  Although the result of the campaign turned out exactly like Chiang Kai-shek and his subordinates had predicted, and consequently the power of the warlords in this region was indeed reduced as their military forces were smashed by the communists, so that the warlord problem plagued China for so long was thus reduced for this particular region, and Chiang Kai-shek’s secondary objective was achieved here, any positive gains obtained by the nationalists were negated by the politic fallout.  The reason was that this success of achieving the secondary objective came at a huge cost in nationalists’ loss of popular support in this region formerly dominated by the Japanese, because the local population had already blamed nationalists for losing the regions to the Japanese invaders, while reassigning these former Japanese puppet regime forces as the nationalist forces to fight the communists, the only Chinese force left in the regions, only further alienated the local populace and strengthened the popular resentment to Chiang Kai-shek and his nationalist regime.

See also
List of battles of the Chinese Civil War
National Revolutionary Army
History of the People's Liberation Army
Chinese Civil War

References
Zhu, Zongzhen and Wang, Chaoguang, Liberation War History, 1st Edition, Social Scientific Literary Publishing House in Beijing, 2000,  (set)
Zhang, Ping, History of the Liberation War, 1st Edition, Chinese Youth Publishing House in Beijing, 1987,  (pbk.)
Jie, Lifu, Records of the Liberation War: The Decisive Battle of Two Kinds of Fates, 1st Edition, Hebei People's Publishing House in Shijiazhuang, 1990,  (set)
Literary and Historical Research Committee of the Anhui Committee of the Chinese People's Political Consultative Conference, Liberation War, 1st Edition, Anhui People's Publishing House in Hefei, 1987, 
Li, Zuomin, Heroic Division and Iron Horse: Records of the Liberation War, 1st Edition, Chinese Communist Party History Publishing House in Beijing, 2004, 
Wang, Xingsheng, and Zhang, Jingshan, Chinese Liberation War, 1st Edition, People's Liberation Army Literature and Art Publishing House in Beijing, 2001,  (set)
Huang, Youlan, History of the Chinese People's Liberation War, 1st Edition, Archives Publishing House in Beijing, 1992, 
Liu Wusheng, From Yan'an to Beijing: A Collection of Military Records and Research Publications of Important Campaigns in the Liberation War, 1st Edition, Central Literary Publishing House in Beijing, 1993, 
Tang, Yilu and Bi, Jianzhong, History of Chinese People's Liberation Army in Chinese Liberation War, 1st Edition, Military Scientific Publishing House in Beijing, 1993 – 1997,  (Volum 1), 7800219615 (Volum 2), 7800219631 (Volum 3), 7801370937 (Volum 4), and 7801370953 (Volum 5)

Conflicts in 1945
Tianmen
1945 in China
Military history of Hubei